Jorge Enrique González Pacheco is an international award-winning Cuban poet, film industry professional, and cultural entrepreneur. He has a Bachelor's Degree in Latin American Literature from University of Havana, Cuba, and a Master's Degree in Hispanic Literature from Complutense University of Madrid, Spain.

Biography

González Pacheco was born in Marianao, Havana, on September 9, 1969. His mother died when he was very young, and his relationship with his father was turbulent. González Pacheco moved to the United States in 2003, and since 2006 he has been living in Seattle.

He published his first poem in Alaluz, a literary magazine of the University of California, Riverside. He has published six books, including Under the light of my blood.

In 1990 integrated the group of young poets that participated at the revolution of Cuban literature that distanced itself from political themes and created a clearer and more universal lyric. As a freedom defender, in an interview he criticized the situation of the civil liberties on his country.

One of his well-known poems titled "Havana" is dedicated to his childhood city.

González Pacheco is the founder and CEO of the Seattle Latino Film Festival (SLFF), a 501(c)(3) non-profit organization. SLFF is ranked on Top 5 of the most important Latino film festivals in the United States. Also he's the founder of Cine Seattle Entertainment LLC,  a film production company located in Washington State.

He has read his poetry in the United States and many other countries, including Spain.

Books
(1992) Poesía Ilustrada, International Edition Group, New York, NY, USA
(2003) Antología de la Décima Cósmica de La Habana, FAH, Mexico City, Mexico
(2003) Notaciones del Inocente, Ediciones Qneras, Moguer, Spain
(2004) Tierra de Secreta Transparencia, Torremozas & Fundación Juan Ramon Jimenez, Madrid, Spain
(2009) Bajo la luz de mi sangre / Under the Light of my Blood (bilingual edition), Trafford, Victoria BC,  Canada
(2020) Habitante Invisible, Ediciones Deslinde, Madrid, España

Awards
 1996 Delia Carrera Poetry Prize, Havana, Cuba
 2015 HIPGivers Award by Hispanics in Philanthropy, San Francisco, California, USA
 2018 Mayor's Arts Award, Seattle,  Washington, USA

Interview
La Poesía en su Sangre 
Un poète cubain-étasunien sur les rues de France.
 Radio Interview in Spanish with Paula Lamas 
 Fundo uno de los festivales de cine latino mas completos de Estados Unidos

Notes
 González Pacheco, Jorge Enrique (1995). “La mudez del alba”. Revista Alaluz. XXVII (1): pag 59.
González Pacheco, Jorge Enrique (2008). La dócil alba que en tu altura guia-L'aube docile qui depuis ton royaume guide. Paris, France: Arcoiris, Revue de Création Littéraire Bilingue. pp. 322, 323. 
González Pacheco, Jorge Enrique, Poetry Now, Sacramento Poetry Center (2009), California, USA
Puentes Izquierdo, Zoraida (2011). Literatura Cubana contemporánea (1959-1999) Selección de lecturas (1ra ed.). Universidad de las Artes, Havana, Cuba: Ediciones Cúpulas. pp. 28, 30, 88. 
González Pacheco, Jorge Enrique, Poem: Pobre espacio del que huyo, Azahares, Spanish Language Literary Magazine (2015): pag 28, College of Languages and Communication, University of Arkansas - Fort Smith. USA
González Pacheco, Jorge Enrique, Poems: Homeless and Inventario, Spanish Language Literary Magazine (2019): pag 5,6 College of Languages and Communication, University of Arkansas - Fort Smith. USA
González Pacheco, Jorge Enrique, Revista Literaria  (2020), pp 81, 82 University of South Florida - Tampa. USA
González Pacheco, Jorge Enrique, Spanish Language Literary Magazine (2022): pags 33, 34, College of Languages and Communication, University of Arkansas - Fort Smith. USA
+LATINO/A DIASPORA HERITAGE RESOURCE PACKET, Burke Museum, University of Washington (WA) pag 3

References

External links
Official website
González Pacheco, Jorge Enrique, Library of Congress
 Jorge Enrique Gonzalez Pacheco at IMDb

1969 births
Living people
Cuban male poets
Writers from Havana
University of Havana alumni
Complutense University of Madrid alumni
Poets from Washington (state)